Whetstone Township may refer to the following townships in the United States:

 Whetstone Township, Adams County, North Dakota
 Whetstone Township, Crawford County, Ohio